Durango is a home rule municipality that is the county seat and the most populous municipality of La Plata County, Colorado, United States. The city population was 19,071 at the 2020 United States Census. Durango is the home of Fort Lewis College.

History
The town was organized from September 1880 to April 1881 by the Denver and Rio Grande Railroad (D&RG, later known as the Denver and Rio Grande Western railroad) as part of their efforts to reach Silverton, Colorado, and service the San Juan mining district, the goal of their "San Juan Extension" built from Alamosa Colorado. The D&RG chose a site in the Animas Valley close to the Animas River near what's now the Downtown Durango Historic Business District for its railroad facilities following a brief and most likely perfunctory negotiation with the other establishment in the area known as Animas City, two miles to the north. The city was named by ex-Colorado Governor Alexander C. Hunt, a friend of D&RG President William Jackson Palmer, after Durango, Mexico, based on his favorable impression of that city resulting from a scouting trip undertaken on behalf of Palmer.

Palmer among other D&RG associates such as William Bell started a subsidiary company known as the Durango Trust to sell land and plan a Main Street, 2nd, and 3rd Avenue, and so on to organize the town, taking inspiration from how Palmer founded the city of Colorado Springs. Sales from the Durango Trust skyrocketed by the completion of the D&RG's Silverton Branch, and by 1885, Durango’s business district had seven hotels and restaurants, eleven saloons, dancehalls and stores, two bakeries and blacksmith shops, and a variety of other businesses, also boosting the town of Silverton’s population to 2,000 at the time.

The D&RG(W) and the Rio Grande Southern Railroad were vital resources to many places including Durango before the major introduction of the automobile, helping transport goods such as produce and mineral traffic in and out of the Southwestern Colorado area, and along with other businesses such as the Durango Smelter, immensely supporting the town's economy. However, the Great Depression and aftermath of World War II hurt the area's railroad industry. The Rio Grande Southern lost its contract to transport mail in 1951, and soon thereafter suspended operations. The D&RGW also ended their San Juan Express passenger service from Durango to Alamosa. However, the natural scenery along their Silverton Branch had been recognized as a major tourist attraction. In turn, the D&RGW introduced the major tourism industry into the Durango area, transporting visitors up to Silverton and back and attracting Hollywood into La Plata County for a time. Once the D&RGW ended up losing its freight traffic in 1968, the tracks from Durango east to Chama, New Mexico, and south to Farmington, New Mexico were removed, but the Silverton Branch remained in operation until 1981 when it was sold and became the Durango & Silverton Narrow Gauge Railroad.

There are significant archaeological sites surrounding the Durango area featured on the State and National historical registers, including:
 Mesa Verde National Park, a World Heritage site
 Chimney Rock National Monument, the most northeastern known outpost of the Ancestral Puebloans
 Durango Rock Shelters Archeology Site, a Basketmaker and Pueblo culture
 Spring Creek Archeological District, a Basketmaker and Pueblo site
 Talus Village, a Basketmaker site

Geography
At the 2020 United States Census, the town had a total area of  including  of water.

Climate
According to the Köppen climate classification system, Durango has a mediterranean continental climate (Dsa).
Its hardiness zone is 5b.

Demographics

As of the 2000 census, there were 13,922 people, 5,492 households, and 2,603 families residing in the city. The racial makeup of the city was 86.8% White, 0.5% African American, 5.5% Native American, 0.7% Asian, 0.1% Pacific Islander, 4.1% from other races, and 2.2% from two or more races. Hispanic or Latino of any race were 10.3% of the population.

There were 5,492 households, out of which 22.4% had children under the age of 18 living with them, 34.2% were married couples living together, 9.4% had a single female householder, and 52.6% were non-families. 31.8% of all households were made up of individuals, and 9.0% had someone living alone who was 65 years of age or older. The average household size was 2.23 and the average family size was 2.83.

In the city, 16.6% of residents were under the age of 18, 26.1% from 18 to 24, 27.2% from 25 to 44, 19.4% from 45 to 64, and 10.7% who were 65 years of age or older. The median age was 29 years. For every 100 females, there were 104.1 males. For every 100 females age 18 and over, there were 103.8 males.

The median income for a household in the city was $34,892, and the median income for a family was $50,814. Males had a median income of $31,812 versus $25,022 for females. The per capita income for the city was $19,352. 17.2% of the population and 7.3% of families were living below the poverty line. 11.2% of those younger than 18 and 8.9% of those 65 and older were living below the poverty line.

Arts and culture

Attractions

Main Avenue

Main Avenue is a Nationally Registered Historic District that cuts through downtown Durango and is home to galleries, boutiques, restaurants, bars, and other businesses. Two notable and historic hotels, The General Palmer and The Strater, lie at the south end of the avenue, near the Durango & Silverton Narrow Gauge Railroad depot. With its combination of historic architecture, entertainment, and shopping, Main Avenue has historically comprised the center of Durango and is a popular year-round tourist destination.

Durango & Silverton Narrow Gauge Railroad
Durango is known worldwide for the Durango & Silverton Narrow Gauge Railroad, a heritage railroad that operates what was the Denver & Rio Grande Western's Branchline to the historic mining town of Silverton, Colorado, also still notably using historic D&RGW Steam Locomotives and other historic rail equipment.

Animas River Valley
The Animas River Valley begins in the heart of the San Juan Mountains and runs through downtown Durango. It boasts gold medal fly fishing waters and is popular for whitewater rafting, kayaking and canoeing. On warm summer afternoons a popular diversion is to buy an inflated inner tube and float from Animas City to Schneider Park or below.

Purgatory Ski Resort
Purgatory Resort, located 25 miles north of downtown Durango, has 99 trails, 12 lifts, a vertical drop of over 2,000 feet, and more than 1,500 acres of skiable terrain. The resort features lodging, ski rentals, shopping, and dining. Purgatory is also a popular summertime recreation destination.

Snowdown Festival
Durango is home to Snowdown, an annual midwinter event popular for its Parade of Lights and other events. The event lasts 5 days, with competitions and costumes.

Music in the Mountains
Music in the Mountains is an annual classical summer music festival with performances at Purgatory Resort, Ft. Lewis College, in downtown Durango, and Cortez.

As of 2019, the festival is no longer being held at Purgatory Resort.

Durango Ragtime & Early Jazz Festival
The annual Durango Ragtime & Early Jazz Festival features noted musicians from around the country. It is held in the Strater Hotel, a historic Victorian hotel in Durango.

Iron Horse Bicycle Classic

Founded in 1972, the Iron Horse is a 61-mile bicycle road race held annually in Durango, CO. Every year cyclists from around the world come together and race the Durango Narrow Gauge Train on its journey from Durango to Silverton.

Media

Durango has a number of media outlets, which include The Durango Herald, 99x Durango, The Point, KDGO, XRock 105.3, KDUR 91.9/93.9, Four Corners Broadcasting (KIQX 101.3, KRSJ 100.5, KKDC 93.3, and KKDC AM 930) and many others.

Infrastructure

Public Transportation
Durango is served by U.S. Highway 160 (the Old Spanish Trail), running east–west, and U.S. Highway 550, running north–south. Part of U.S. 550 offers high-speed access (primarily a 4-lane, divided highway) to Albuquerque, New Mexico. North of Durango, 550 is nicknamed the Million Dollar Highway, and is part of the scenic San Juan Skyway.

Durango is served by Durango–La Plata County Airport (IATA code: DRO), a major regional airport for southwestern Colorado, located near Ignacio, Colorado. The airport is serviced year-round by regional carriers Mesa Airlines (American Eagle), SkyWest Airlines (American Eagle and United Express), Republic Airways (United Express), and Envoy Air (American Eagle).

As of 2014, regional connecting hubs to DRO include Dallas/Fort Worth International Airport (DFW), Phoenix Sky Harbor International Airport (PHX), and Denver International Airport (DEN).

Durango Transit provides several loop bus routes in the community, including Fort Lewis College. Normal hours of operation are weekdays from 6:30 am to 6:30 pm. Ignacio Road Runner provides bus service to the nearby towns of Ignacio, Colorado and Bayfield, Colorado, with four trips daily on weekdays and one on Saturdays. Both services share the Durango Transit Center as a hub.

Greyhound Lines formerly served Durango, but after budget cuts, the service was discontinued. Since 2014, Road Runner Transit (a service of Southern Ute Community Action Programs) has restored daily bus service between Grand Junction and Durango. Since 2018, Road Runner's service has been incorporated into the larger mantle of the state-run program Bustang.

Colleges
 Fort Lewis College is on a  mesa overlooking downtown Durango and is accredited by the Higher Learning Commission. As of 2014, 4,028 students were enrolled at FLC. FLC is a public 4-year liberal arts college.
 Southwest Colorado Community College, a branch of Pueblo Community College, is in the Durango Highschool building on North Main Ave.

Notable people

 Paco Ahlgren, writer
 Ross Anderson, World Cup/professional speed skier, All-American record holder
 Steve Carlton, Baseball Hall of Fame pitcher 
 James Garesche Ord, United States Army Major General, born at Fort Lewis near Durango
 Missy Giove, cyclist inducted into the Mountain Bike Hall of Fame
 Howard Grotts, cyclist
 Greg Herbold, cyclist inducted into the Mountain Bike Hall of Fame
 Sepp Kuss, cyclist, Vuelta a España and Tour de France stage winner
 Matt Miller, NFL offensive tackle for the Cleveland Browns
 Ned Overend, cyclist inducted into the Mountain Bike Hall of Fame and the United States Bicycling Hall of Fame
 Bob Roll, retired pro cyclist; part of NBC Sports cycling broadcasting team.
 Stuart Roosa, NASA astronaut and former USFS Smoke Jumper
 Quinn Simmons, cyclist
 Ed Stasium, record producer
 Tom Tully, actor, Oscar nominee for The Caine Mutiny
 Shan Wells, sculptor and illustrator
 Todd Wells, cyclist
 Eli Tomac, professional motocross racer.

Sister cities

  Durango, Mexico
  Durango, Spain

References in television and film
The Denver & Rio Grande Western Railroad began to advertise the La Plata County Area to Hollywood beginning in the mid 1930s, kick starting Durango's future in film appearances.
Parts of the 1948 film Colorado Territory were filmed in the Durango area including the Railroad Depot and the D&RGW's railroad line south to Farmington, New Mexico.
The 1950 Film A Ticket to Tomahawk was shot primarily in the La Plata County area involving the D&RGW's Silverton Branch (later to become the Durango & Silverton Narrow Gauge Railroad), filmed north of Durango, Silverton, Colorado, on the current site of Fort Lewis College, as well as a shot of a Rio Grande Southern Railroad Trestle located west of Durango near Wild Cat Canyon. This was one of Marilyn Monroe's first onscreen appearances as well.
Much of the 1952 film Denver and Rio Grande was shot on whats now the D&RGW's Silverton Branch, retelling the story of the D&RG's battle for rights into the Royal Gorge, against the Atchison, Topeka and Santa Fe Railroad.
Much of the 1953 western movie The Naked Spur starring James Stewart was shot in Durango.
 Several parts of the 1955 western film Run for Cover starring James Cagney, were filmed just north of Durango in and around the upper Hermosa Valley area. Includes shots of the D&RGW Silverton Branch as well. 
 Portions of the 1957 western Night Passage starring a returning James Stewart, as well as Audie Murphy and Brandon deWilde were filmed near Durango and on the D&RGW's Silverton Branch.
 Parts of the 1969 film Butch Cassidy and the Sundance Kid were filmed north of town along the Animas River, as well as scenes of the D&RGW Railroad on the Silverton branch, and southeast of Durango near Florida, as well as other locations on the D&RGW narrow gauge system.
The 1978 Roger Corman film Avalanche, starring Rock Hudson and Mia Farrow, was filmed mainly at Durango Mountain Resort and at the Lodge at Tamarron in north Durango.
 The television series Cannon, episode "Sky Above, Death Below" was filmed in and around Durango, Purgatory Resort, and Chimney Rock.
 Part of the 1991 film City Slickers was shot in Durango.
 The 1999 movie Durango Kids describes a time tunnel in the old mines outside of Durango.
 Parts of the 1993 film Cliffhanger were shot in Durango.

See also

Colorado
Bibliography of Colorado
Index of Colorado-related articles
Outline of Colorado
List of counties in Colorado
List of municipalities in Colorado
List of places in Colorado
List of statistical areas in Colorado
Durango, CO Micropolitan Statistical Area
Durango & Silverton Narrow-Gauge Railroad
Durango Herald
Durango Telegraph
Old Spanish National Historic Trail

References

External links

City of Durango website
CDOT map of the City of Durango
Durango Ragtime and Early Jazz Festival website 

 
Cities in La Plata County, Colorado
Cities in Colorado
County seats in Colorado
Company towns in Colorado
Populated places established in 1881
1881 establishments in Colorado